Cowboy Stadium is a 17,610-seat multi-purpose stadium in Lake Charles, Louisiana. It is home to the McNeese Cowboys football team, and is affectionately referred to as "The Hole". It was transformed for the 2008 season to artificial turf. The playing surface is named Louis Bonnette Field, in honor of McNeese's longtime sports information director. Louis' son, Matthew, succeeded him in the post and continues to hold it as of July 2016. The playing surface was replaced prior to the 2018 football season with Hellas Matrix turf. The $650,000 new surface as well as drainage improvements were funded by the same donor, Robert Noland, as for the 2008 installation.

History
Jack V. Dolan Field House officially opened in September, 2011. The new state of the art $8.25 million field house (53,838 sq ft) more than doubled the size of the former field house (30,141 sq ft). It includes climate-controlled seating and a club room.

Features
The field house includes the following:

Weight room 
Conference rooms
Enlarged ticket office
Enlarged locker room
Team meeting rooms
Hall of fame room
Coaches offices
Outdoor seating deck
Indoor club room
Academic resource center

See also
List of NCAA Division I FCS football stadiums

References

College football venues
McNeese Cowboys football
American football venues in Louisiana
Multi-purpose stadiums in the United States
Buildings and structures in Lake Charles, Louisiana
Sports venues in Lake Charles, Louisiana
1965 establishments in Louisiana
Sports venues completed in 1965